The calculus of moving surfaces (CMS)  is an extension of the classical tensor calculus to deforming manifolds. Central to the CMS is the Tensorial Time Derivative  whose original definition  was put forth by Jacques Hadamard. It plays the role analogous to that of the covariant derivative  on differential manifolds in that it produces a tensor when applied to a tensor.

Suppose that  is the evolution of the surface  indexed by a time-like parameter . The definitions of the surface velocity  and the operator  are the geometric foundations of the CMS. The velocity C is the rate of deformation of the surface  in the instantaneous normal direction.

 

The velocity  is a signed quantity: it is positive when  points in the direction of the chosen normal, and negative otherwise.

 

This definition is also illustrated in second geometric figure.

The above definitions are geometric. In analytical settings, direct application of these definitions may not be possible.

Analytical definitions

 

By convention, tensor indices of function arguments are dropped. The velocity object  is defined as the partial derivative

 

The velocity  can be computed most directly by the formula

 

where  are the covariant components of the normal vector .

 

where  is the covariant derivative on S.

For tensors, an appropriate generalization is needed. The proper definition for a representative tensor  reads

 

Properties of the -derivative

The -derivative commutes with contraction, satisfies the product rule for any collection of indices

 

and obeys a chain rule for surface restrictions of spatial tensors:

 

Chain rule shows that the -derivatives of spatial "metrics" vanishes

 

The main article on Levi-Civita symbols describes them for Cartesian coordinate systems. The preceding rule is valid in general coordinates, where the definition of the Levi-Civita symbols must include the square root of the determinant of the covariant metric tensor .

Differentiation table for the -derivative

The  derivative of the key surface objects leads to highly concise and attractive formulas. When applied to the covariant surface metric tensor  and the contravariant metric tensor , the following identities result

 

These curvature tensors, as well as for the mixed curvature tensor , satisfy

 

The shift tensor  and the normal satisfy

 

Finally, the surface Levi-Civita symbols  and  satisfy

Time differentiation of integrals 
The CMS provides rules for time differentiation of volume and surface integrals.

References

Tensors
Differential geometry
Riemannian geometry
Curvature (mathematics)
Calculus